Metrosexual is a portmanteau of metropolitan and sexual describing a man in an urban,  post-industrial, capitalist culture, who is especially meticulous about his grooming and appearance, typically spending a significant amount of time and money on shopping as part of this. The term initially did not assert whether a metrosexual is heterosexual, gay or a bisexual man, but in marketing practice the metrosexual is considered "straight."

Origin
The term metrosexual originated in an article by Mark Simpson published on November 15, 1994, in The Independent. Although various sources attributed the term to Marian Salzman, she credited Simpson as the original source for her usage of the word. 
 
The term became popular in 2002 with an article describing David Beckham as "the biggest metrosexual in Britain," offering this definition:

The advertising agency Euro RSCG Worldwide adopted the term shortly thereafter for a marketing study. In 2003, The New York Times ran a story, "Metrosexuals Come Out".  The term and its connotations continued to roll steadily into more news outlets around the world.
Though it did represent a complex and gradual change in the shopping and self-presentation habits of both men and women, the idea of metrosexuality was often distilled in the media down to a few men and a short checklist of vanities, like skin care products, scented candles and costly, colorful dress shirts and pricey designer jeans. It was this image of the metrosexual—that of a straight young man who got pedicures and facials, practiced aromatherapy and spent freely on clothes—that contributed to a backlash against the term from men who merely wanted to feel free to take more care with their appearance than had been the norm in the 1990s, when companies abandoned dress codes, Dockers khakis became a popular brand, and XL, or extra-large, became the one size that fit all. A 60 Minutes story on 1960s–70s pro footballer Joe Namath suggested he was "perhaps, America's first metrosexual" after filming his most famous ad sporting Beautymist pantyhose.

One argument is that metrosexuality is a historical phenomenon, much like the Aesthetic Movement of the 19th century, the metrosexual is a modern incarnation of a dandy. Fashion designer Tom Ford drew parallels when he described David Beckham as a: "total modern dandy". Ford suggested that  "macho" sporting role models who also care about fashion and appearance influence masculine norms in wider society.

Related terms

Over the course of the following years, other terms countering or substituting for "metrosexual" appeared. 

 Retrosexual. It meant anti- or pre-metrosexual sense. Later on, the term was used by some to describe men who subscribed to what they affected to be the grooming and dress standards of a previous era, such as the handsome, impeccably turned-out fictional character of Donald Draper in the television series Mad Men, itself set in an idealised version of the early 1960s New York advertising world. 
 Ubersexual: A term coined by marketing executives and authors of The Future of Men. 
 Spornosexual: A term blending sports, porn, and sexual. In 2016, Simpson argued that footballer Cristiano Ronaldo represents "a fusion of sport and porn [...] Cultivating an athletic body as an object of desire, and showing it off on social networks, accumulating sexual partners. It’s a tendency with young men."

 Lumbersexual. In 2016-2017, the "lumbersexual" term circulated in media, fashion, and online outlets, describing a type of male aesthetics that use outdoor gear for urban aesthetics rather than function.
 Narcissism.  The metrosexual has been described as a man with "narcissistic self-absorption," as a way to break from prevailing masculine codes.
 Female metrosexual. Although the term refers mostly to men, a discussion exists on whether women can be metrosexuals.  Characters from the HBO series Sex and the City have been described as wo-metrosexuality to illustrate how the metrosexual lifestyle de-emphasizes traditional male and female gender roles.

Changing masculinity

Traditional masculine norms, as described in psychologist Ronald F. Levant's Masculinity Reconstructed are: "avoidance of femininity; restricted emotions; sex disconnected from intimacy; pursuit of achievement and status; self-reliance; strength; aggression and homophobia".

Various studies, including market research by Euro RSCG, have suggested that the pursuit of achievement and status is not as important to men as it used to be; and neither is, to a degree, the restriction of emotions or the disconnection of sex from intimacy. Another norm change supported by research is that men "no longer find sexual freedom universally enthralling". Lillian Alzheimer noted less avoidance of femininity and the "emergence of a segment of men who have embraced customs and attitudes once deemed the province of women".

Men's fashion magazines – such as Details, Men's Vogue, and the defunct Cargo – targeted what one Details editor called "men who moisturize and read a lot of magazines".

Changes in culture and attitudes toward masculinity, visible in the media through television shows such as Queer Eye for the Straight Guy, Queer as Folk, and Will & Grace, have changed these traditional masculine norms. Metrosexuals only made their appearance after cultural changes in the environment and changes in views on masculinity. Simpson said in his article "Metrosexual? That rings a bell..." that "Gay men provided the early prototype for metrosexuality. Decidedly single, definitely urban, dreadfully uncertain of their identity (hence the emphasis on pride and the susceptibility to the latest label) and socially emasculated, gay men pioneered the business of accessorising—and combining—masculinity and desirability."

But such probing analyses into various shoppers' psyches may have ignored other significant factors affecting men's shopping habits, foremost among them women's shopping habits. As the retail analyst Marshal Cohen explained in a 2005 article in the New York Times entitled, "Gay or Straight? Hard to Tell", the fact that women buy less of men's clothing than they used to has, more than any other factor, propelled men into stores to shop for themselves. "In 1985 only 25 percent of all men's apparel was bought by men, he said; 75 percent was bought by women for men. By 1998 men were buying 52 percent of apparel; in 2004 that number grew to 69 percent and shows no sign of slowing." One result of this shift was the revelation that men cared more about how they look than the women shopping for them had.

However, despite changes in masculinity, research has suggested men still feel social pressure to endorse traditional masculine male models in advertising. Martin and Gnoth  (2009) found that feminine men preferred feminine models in private, but stated a preference for the traditional masculine models when their collective self was salient. In other words, feminine men endorsed traditional masculine models when they were concerned about being classified by other men as feminine. The authors suggested this result reflected the social pressure on men to endorse traditional masculine norms.

In marketing
Whereas the metrosexual was a cultural observation, the term is  used in marketing and popular media. In this context, the metrosexual is a heterosexual, urban man who is in touch with his feminine side— he color-coordinates, cares deeply about exfoliation, and has perhaps manscaped. The term suggests that straight men can improve his personal appearance.

See also

References

Further reading
 Simpson, Mark (2011).'Metrosexy: A 21st Century Self-Love Story'
 O'Reilly, Ann; Matathia, Ira; Salzman, Marian (2005). The Future of Men, Palgrave Macmillan. .

External links

 'Metrodaddy Speaks!' Mark Simpson answers questions from the global media in 2004
 2005 reassessment by Simpson
 "The Metrosexual Defined; Narcissism and Masculinity in Popular Culture"  Article exploring the commercial and sociological sides of the metrosexual
  The Metrosexual: Gender, Sexuality, and Sport by David Coad. Albany, New York: SUNY Press, 2008
 Media Sport Stars: Masculinities and Moralities, Gary Whannel, Jstor, 2002

Popular culture neologisms
LGBT and society
Narcissism
Fashion
Stereotypes
Stereotypes of men
Stereotypes of urban people
Terms for men
Subcultures
2000s fads and trends
1990s neologisms
Heterosexuality